Jeremy Charles Ward (born 10 January 1996), is a South African professional rugby union player for the  in Super Rugby, Currie Cup and the  in the Rugby Challenge. His regular playing position is centre.

Rugby career

2012–2014 : Schoolboy rugby

Ward was born and raised in Port Elizabeth where he attended the city's Grey High School, where he played rugby union and water polo. In 2012, he was included in the Eastern Province Under-16 squad that participated at the Grant Khomo Week tournament, where he played in all three of their matches, scoring two points via a conversion in their match against SWD.

Ward represented Eastern Province at the premier South African high schools competition, the Under-18 Craven Week, on two occasions – at the 2013 tournament in Polokwane and the 2014 tournament in Middelburg, helping Eastern Province to win the unofficial final of the 2014 tournament for the first time since 1977, beating SWD 25–7. Shortly after the 2014 Craven Week, Ward was also included in the  squad that participated in the 2014 Under-19 Provincial Championship, their first season in Group A of the competition following winning promotion in 2013.

2015 : Eastern Province Under-19

Ward remained in the Eastern Province Under-19 side for the 2015 Under-19 Provincial Championship, also being named captain of the side. Ward featured in eleven of their twelve matches during the regular season.

2016 : Eastern Province Kings and South Africa Under-20

In March 2016, Ward was included in a South Africa Under-20 training squad, and made the cut to be named in a reduced provisional squad a week later. On 10 May 2016, he was included in the final squad for the 2016 World Rugby Under 20 Championship tournament to be held in Manchester, England, also being named captain of the team. He started in their opening match in Pool C of the tournament, scoring two tries as South Africa came from behind to beat Japan 59–19. He also started their other two pool matches as South Africa were beaten 13–19 by Argentina in their second match, but bounced back to secure a 40-31 bonus-point victory over France in their final pool match to secure a semi-final place as the best runner-up in the competition. Ward captained the side as they faced three-time champions England in the semi-finals, but the hosts proved too strong for South Africa, knocking them out of the competition with a 39–17 victory. Ward was sin-binned in the 16th minute of the match, with the World Rugby Disciplinary Committee subsequently handing him a two-week ban. This ruled Ward out of the final match against Argentina, in the third-place play-off final. Argentina beat South Africa – as they did in the pool stages – convincingly winning 49–19 and in the process condemning South Africa to fourth place in the competition.

2017 : Sharks

On 27 July 2016, the  based in Durban announced that they signed Ward for the 2017 Super Rugby season where he still currently plays.

References

External links
 

1996 births
Living people
Rugby union players from Port Elizabeth
South African rugby union players
South African people of British descent
Rugby union centres
Eastern Province Elephants players
South Africa Under-20 international rugby union players
Southern Kings players
White South African people
Alumni of Grey High School
Sharks (Currie Cup) players
Sharks (rugby union) players
Stade Français players